Robinsons Relocation is a removal and storage company with its headquarters located in Abingdon, Oxfordshire. Robinsons are one of the oldest functioning moving and storage specialist companies in the United Kingdom, dating back to the 19th Century. The company has further facilities in London, Manchester, Southampton, Basingstoke, Bristol, and Birmingham allowing them to cover the whole of the United Kingdom.

Robinsons Relocation was founded in Manchester in 1895 by Alfred Robinson and was the recipients of the European EMMA International Moving Company of the Year award in 2010 and 2011 and have accreditations for quality systems ISO 9000:2008, ISO14001:2004 and industry standard FAIM Plus.

History
Since its emergence in the 19th century, the company has remained under the control of the Robinson family. Alfred’s four sons went on to become working directors of the business and up to the present day the fourth generation of the Robinson family have been influential to the company’s growth with Alfred’s great grandson Anthony now taking up the role of Managing Director. Philippa Robinson, sister to Anthony, manages the Corporate and International business as Chief Operating Officer.

By 1911, the company had become the first removal company within the United Kingdom to provide road service from North to South after the opening of their London branch, which was shortly followed by the unveiling of their Birmingham warehouse in 1928.

After the war the company opened a warehouse in Bristol in 1948 and introduced computerised moving and migration services in the late 60’s. Due to the encouragement from the British government for Britons to immigrate to Australia as part of the Commonwealth, Robinson’s took advantage of the high demand for further migration services in the relocation industry.

Awards
 European EMMA "International Moving Company of the Year" - 2010, 2011
 "Rising Star Award" (Awarded to Julian Grose- Hodge, Manager) - 2011

References

External links
Official Website
Moving Company

1895 establishments in England
Removal companies of the United Kingdom
Storage companies
Companies based in Oxfordshire
British companies established in 1895